Volodymyr Volodymyrovych Nemoshkalenko was Ukrainian physicist, full member (academician) of the National Academy of Science of Ukraine (1982). Most known for the development and application of methods of computational physics in the solid state spectroscopy and, in particular, for the discovery of the phenomenon of inoxidability of simple forms of matter on the surface of the celestial bodies.

Born March 26, 1933 in Stalingrad, now Volgograd. In 1956 he graduated from the Kyiv Polytechnic Institute. From 1956 he worked at the Institute of Metal Physics of NAS of Ukraine (since 1963 – head of department, since 1967 – Deputy Director of the Institute, since 1989 – Director).

His main achievements are associated with the development of physical basis of spectroscopic methods, which allowed to obtain reliable information about the electronic structure and electronic properties of materials, and in merging the electron spectroscopy experiment with the electronic band structure calculations—the two research directions which he had founded in the Institute of Metal Physics. V.V. Nemoshkalenko is co-discoverer of the phenomenon of inoxidability of simple forms of matter on the surface of the celestial bodies.

Lived in Kyiv. Died on June 25, 2002.

Honors and awards
Order of the Badge of Honour, 1971
Corresponding member of the National Academy of Science of Ukraine, since 1973
Prize of K.D. Sinelnikov, 1977
State Prize of Ukrainian SSR, 1980
Order of the Red Banner of Labour, 1981
Member of the National Academy of Science of Ukraine, since 1982.
State Prize of USSR, 1985
State Prize of RSFSR, 1989
State Prize of Ukraine, 1992, 2002
Prize of N.P. Barabashov, 1992
Order of Prince Yaroslav the Wise, 1997
Prize of G.V. Kurdyumov, 1999

References

1933 births
2002 deaths
Members of the National Academy of Sciences of Ukraine
People from Volgograd
Russian people of Ukrainian descent
Soviet inventors
20th-century Ukrainian inventors
Academic staff of the Moscow Institute of Physics and Technology
20th-century Ukrainian physicists
Recipients of the Order of Prince Yaroslav the Wise
Soviet physicists
Laureates of the State Prize of Ukraine in Science and Technology